High-floor describes the interior flooring of commuter vehicles primarily used in public transport such as trains, light rail cars and other rail vehicles, along with buses and trolleybuses. Interior floor height is generally measured above the street surface or above the top of the rail. High-floor designs usually result from packaging requirements: mechanical items such as axles, motors, crankshafts, and/or transmissions, or luggage storage spaces are traditionally placed under the interior floor of these vehicles. The term is used in contrast with low-floor designs, which offer a decreased floor and entry height above the street surface. Since low-floor designs generally were developed after high-floor vehicles, the older high-floor design is sometimes also known as conventional or the “traditional” design.

Rail

Heavy rail

To enhance accessibility and optimize dwell times, railway platform heights at stations are standard to allow level boarding for commuters on high platforms. According to one definition, level boarding means the gap between the platform and the floor of the track varies by no more than  horizontally and  vertically. Level boarding is also known as stepless entry since passengers do not have to negotiate a staircase to board the passenger car.

For newly constructed routes, routes primarily located in tunnels, or routes with a dedicated right of way and enough space, high platforms are usually preferred, since high-floor vehicles are cheaper to manufacture, and have better operating characteristics. High platforms do have significant advantages beyond level boarding for wheelchair accessibility.  Physically disabled passengers (e.g. those using wheelchairs or who have difficulties climbing stairs) also benefit, as do travelers pulling wheeled luggage or small folding shopping carts.  Even physically non-disabled passengers can board a railcar more rapidly if they do not have to climb stairs to enter, reducing dwell time at a stop, and reducing overall travel time.  In addition, high-platform railcars have more floor space for passengers if space is not required for stairways, and wheelwells needed to accommodate train bogies.

Because bilevel rail cars have two passenger levels within a standard height rail car, the lower level, where passengers board, is generally lower than a conventional high-floor car. Hence level boarding with a bilevel car is accomplished using a lower platform, as low as  ATOR.

Light rail
Because tram/light-rail/streetcar vehicles often share loading gauge sizes with heavy rail vehicles, these passenger vehicles usually also use high floor designs. Existing tram/streetcar/light-rail networks generally feature low platforms as many of the stations or stops are in the streets. The high construction/conversion cost of high platforms and the difficulty of making high platforms compatible with other features of the urban landscape are a significant obstacle to converting tram networks these into urban or commuter rail networks with high platforms.

These problems were a major motivation for the development of low-floor trams, which allow transit operators to avoid the retrofitting of high platforms on existing routes, while still providing improved accessibility. Although low-floor vehicles began to be developed in the 1920s, the first low-floor tram is generally recognized as the Duewag/ACM Vevey design of 1984 deployed in Geneva, providing a floor height of  ATOR.

Bus

Since boarding must be allowed directly from flat ground, long and steep staircases are needed. Transit buses also use high floors to provide mechanical clearances for solid axles, but the use of dropped axles has enabled the creation of low-floor buses and by 2008 in the United States, the majority of new transit bus orders were for low-floor types.

Use

Europe

Germany
Today, in Germany, all rapid transit railways, most commuter trains, and many light rail vehicles operate as high-floor networks.  A notable exception is the city railway in Cologne; in the mid-1990s, it was decided to divide that city's partially high-platform network into two separate networks: high-floor and low-floor.

In contrast with some light rail underground lines, which are often provisionally equipped with low platforms or with tracks laid on raised ballast, there are new developments in the German cities of Düsseldorf (Wehrhahn line) and Dortmund (east–west line).  In each of these cities, a new underground light rail line is equipped with platforms for low-floor trams and will be permanently operated with low-floor vehicles.  This form of design and construction will avoid the need for subsequent rebuilding of stops on tram routes, even though both cities already have underground lines with high-floor platforms.

North America

United States
In San Francisco, the Muni Metro light-rail system, which has both on-street and underground stations, uses a combination of high and low platforms, and the vehicles feature retractable stairs to accommodate both platform types. For on-street stations, stairs are deployed within the vehicle to allow boarding from low platforms; as the trains move underground, the stairs rise until they are flush with the floor to allow boarding from high platforms.

See also

List of buses
Low floor
Low-floor bus
Low-floor tram
Railway platform height
Street running
Tram stop

References

External links

This article is based upon a translation of the German language version as at August 2011.

Passenger rail transport
Tram vehicles
Buses by type